For other places with the same name, see Wazirabad (disambiguation)

Timarpur is one of the seven electoral constituencies in North Delhi, India. It is located near University of Delhi and has an area under 2 square kilometers. Its population is about 10,000. Timarpur is the first government colony situated by the Government of India and is predominantly a government residential area.

The area includes eight schools, including six senior secondary schools, one primary school, and one special school for intellectually disabled children.

The health services in Timarpur include the INMAS health center, which is the biggest thyroid center in India. A government-owned CGHS dispensary is also present in the area.

Timarpur is well connected to the Delhi Tilak Basumatary service.

The area also includes a DRDO complex consisting of both residential and official areas.

In Timarpur there is a local dairy village of Gurjar of Mandaar clan since 1911. In the village there around 60-70 families and 180-220 houses in the village.

Legislature
The Delhi legislative assembly seat of Timarpur is currently held by the Aam Aadmi Party. The legislator of the area is Dilip Pandey.

Residence

Most of the area is occupied by government flats, although a private colony is also present there. The area includes about 2,000 government flats which are meant for active government servants. A small portion of the area known as Banarsi Das Estate is privately owned. There are two police stations present in the area. Because it is a government residential area, Timarpur includes only a few markets.

Besides being a government-owned area, a wide portion of the area is occupied by people living in slums. The residents in the government and the private sectors often find it difficult to co-operate with people living in slum areas.

The old market and Timarpur dairy village of Gurjars situated near the flats has a history of more than a hundred years. It was established in 1911.

The new market situated in Timarpur, just at a walking distance from the old market is the center of festivities during the Hindu festival of Dusshera. A grand Ramlila is organized there every year during the festival.

Places to Visit
Timarpur also bears the distinction of housing a 100-year-old plus market. The market (known as the Old Market) was established when Delhi was declared the capital during the British Raj in 1911. Yet the market has not seen development.

Timarpur is surrounded by many tourist attractions like the northern ridge near the North Campus of Delhi University. The area holds a forest where people come to jog and exercise. It was at one time used by the British armed forces during the British Raj. The flagstaff tower there was used by British families as a hiding spot during the Great Indian Mutiny of 1857. The Mutiny Memorial is also situated near the ridge and is an example of the British architecture that was used in India at that time. It was built in memory of the British soldiers who were killed during the mutiny of 1857. Next to the Mutiny Memorial, is an Ashoka pillar that was shifted to Delhi by Feroz Shah Tughlaq (a king from the Tughlaq Dynasty).

The Budh Bazaar, held every Wednesday inside the Central Government Flats, is a center of attraction.

Education and health facilities

The education facilities of Timarpur are moderate. In total, there are eight schools in Timarpur, six of them government-owned and two privately owned. The area is well connected to the University of Delhi.

INMAS
The health facilities of Timarpur include the health center of INMAS which is the biggest and the most technically equipped thyroid center in India. However, the area includes only one dispensary owned by the Government of India. There are several privately owned clinics also present there.

Schools

 Arya Samaj Mandir
 Massom Special School
 Nagar Nigam Vidhyalaya
 Patrachar Vidhyalaya
 Sarvodaya Kanya Vidhyalaya
 Sarvodaya Bal Vidhyalaya
 Sarvodaya Vidhyalaya Lancers Road
 Virendra Public School (private)

References

Cities and towns in North East Delhi district